Marjorie Smith (born February 22, 1941) is an American politician in the state of New Hampshire. She is a member of the New Hampshire House of Representatives, sitting as a Democrat from the Strafford 6 district, having been first elected in 2012. She previously served from 1996 to 2010.

References

Living people
1941 births
Democratic Party members of the New Hampshire House of Representatives
Politicians from New York City
People from Durham, New Hampshire
Women state legislators in New Hampshire
20th-century American women politicians
21st-century American women politicians
20th-century American politicians
21st-century American politicians